The 1st Lagos State House of Assembly is the legislative branch of the Lagos State Government inaugurated on  October 2, 1979, the same year the Lagos State House of Assembly was founded.
The assembly ran its course till October 5, 1983. 
The assembly was unicameral with 41 representatives elected from each constituencies of the state on the platform of the Unity Party of Nigeria.
The Speaker of the 1st Legislative Assembly was Rt. Hon Oladosun Oshinowo and the Deputy speaker was Hon Moshood Muse.
The 2nd Assembly was inaugurated on October 5, 1983, with the election of Oladimeji Longe as speaker.

References

1979 establishments in Nigeria
State lower houses in Nigeria
Lagos State House of Assembly